Fed Up! was an American straight edge hardcore and Krishna Conscious band formed by Caine Rose and Jai Nitai Holzman in late 1987 and active until 1989.

Beginnings

Rose had fronted several notable Richmond, Virginia hardcore bands in the mid to late 80s including Screaming For Change!, What If! and Intact. All of which were straight edge outfits that were basically newer incarnations of the previous with revolving member changes. Fed Up! was the first serious effort Rose had made as a guitarist instead of providing vocals in a group. The band began as an underground animal rights outreach project with all the original members being vegetarians. At the time, the Richmond straight edge scene had become a bastion of enthusiasm for vegetarianism and animal rights issues and the new project, Fed Up! led the charge. Holzman was only 15 years old when he became friends with Rose and turned 16 just after joining Fed Up!. The two became close friends and worked tirelessly on the new project.

Rose and Holzman were arrested and jailed for direct action animal rights demonstrations in the formative period of the band. They had both been street team members for PETA (People for the Ethical Treatment of Animals) long before there even was such a thing and after their arrest, PETA distanced itself from them and offered no support in their defense. This caused disenchantment and opened the door for a new reality for the band. 

Shortly after its inception, co-founder, Caine Rose, having been deeply involved in the eastern religious organization ISKCON (International Society for Krishna Consciousness) since 1987, brought Hare Krsna into the forefront of the band’s focus. Having been inspired by legends Antidote and Cro-Mags and their affiliations with Hare Krsna, Rose wanted a decidedly self pronounced Krsna band to represent the values and beliefs of the Vedic religious tradition. Holzman soon became an enthusiastic devotee of the religion and the two fused the ancient Vedic teachings of Hare Krsna with the contemporary direct action animal rights movement and the burgeoning straight edge hardcore scene of the United States’ east coast. Although several lineup changes took place in the short span of the band’s history, the message remained the same with regards to Krishna consciousness, animal rights issues, drug and alcohol free living, and advocacy for the racially and politically oppressed.

Innovators

It is of popular belief that Fed Up! was the first Hare Krsna hardcore band in the United States- predating the so-called Krishnacore movement made popular by bands Shelter and 108. Fed Up! was also thought to be the first American hardcore band to utilize rap and scratching in their music and recordings. MC Grenade (aka Robert Spruill) of Richmond, Virginia provided rapping.

During the summer of 1988, Fed Up! opened for Youth of Today on their We’re Not In This Alone tour in Richmond, Va. The members of Fed Up! were adorned in Vedic regalia to include bead bags (containing 108 japa beads for chanting the Maha Mantra) and shikha (tufts of hair worn atop a shaven head). Jai Nitai chanted the Hare Krsna Maha Mantra onstage during their set and was accompanied by Ray Cappo and other members of Youth of Today and the audience. This was before Ray Cappo (singer of Youth of Today aka Raghunath had formed the band Shelter, which would later come to define the genre.

Releases

Demo
Fed Up! released a demo tape in early 1988. Certain versions were known as Apocalypse Demo and others as Courage To Change. It included-
Intro/Fed Up!
Courage to Change
Righteous Kids
Thou Shalt Not Kill
Give it Up!
Too Much
Something Must Be Done (by Antidote)

Scratching is contained in the track Righteous Kids as well as other unconventional recording techniques specific to hip hop. Jai Nitai raps a section in the song Courage to Change. Samples were used in various iterations of the demo to include a dialogue from the film The Seventh Sign and a short segment from a New Order track.

Solidarity 7" (unreleased)
In late 1988, the band produced a more polished studio recording; originally intended as a 7” release by One World Records. Of note, Jai Nitai's voice had changed between recording sessions, demonstrating his young age at the time. Even though ads were generated in hardcore fanzines, to include The Razor's Edge by Krishna devotee Kalki Das, issues occurred and the vinyl was never produced. Cassette copies of the material were distributed and sold by mail and at shows by the band for $3. Early copies of the demo featured artwork depicting Planet of the Apes.

Several attempts to release material on vinyl and CD which was recorded from 1988 were made in the early 2000s by Caine Rose and several record labels, including Malfunction Records, but no solid arrangements could be made and so to date, no pressings exist.

Shows

Fed Up! performed with straight edge icons Youth of Today, Bold, Beyond, Judge, Four Walls Falling and others from 1988-89. During their shows, the band would hold kirtan, chant the Maha Mantra during songs, praise the glory of God and talk with audience members before and after the shows about Krishna Consciousness. The band's first show was with Youth of Today in the summer of 1988. Fed Up! played out only as far as Washington DC with Judge, Bold and Beyond at the legendary Safari Club.

Conclusion

Fed Up! broke up in 1989. From 1988-89, Caine Rose had been fronting the Washington DC straight edge band TouchXDown as well as playing bass guitar for Richmond's Four Walls Falling. Rose felt torn between the bands at times and by early 1990, was effectively distanced from the hardcore music scene; finding interest in creating electronic and folk music instead. To date, Jai Nitai Holzman is still a practicing Hare Krishna devotee and vegetarian.

Band members

Original lineup

Jai Nitai Holzman (co-founder)- vocals
Caine Rose (co-founder)- guitar (bass guitar on all recordings)
Tim Promin- bass guitar
Karl D. (Kids For Cash)- drums
Parrish Floyd- drums

Later members

Eric Cohen- bass guitar
Kyle Walker- drums
John Rickman- drums
MC Grenade- rhymes

Related bands
Shelter
Youth of Today
Judge
Four Walls Falling
TouchXDown
Screaming for Change!
Kids For Cash

Straight edge groups
International Society for Krishna Consciousness bands